E. C. Rowell (October 1, 1914 – September 14, 1992) was a politician in the American state of Florida. He served in the Florida House of Representatives from 1966 to 1968, representing the 79th district. He served as Speaker from 1965 to 1967.

References

1914 births
1992 deaths
Members of the Florida House of Representatives
20th-century American politicians
Speakers of the Florida House of Representatives